Cameron Munster (born 13 September 1994) is an Australian professional rugby league footballer who plays as a  for the Melbourne Storm in the NRL and Australia at international level.

Munster has played for Queensland in the State of Origin series, receiving the Wally Lewis Medal in the 2020 series for Player of the Series. Munster won the 2017 NRL Grand Final and 2020 NRL Grand Final  with Melbourne. He played and debuted as a  earlier in his career with enormous success and has represented Queensland in that position but settled into  upon Billy Slater's return from injury in 2017.

Early life
Munster was born in Rockhampton, Queensland, Australia. He was educated at Emmaus College, Rockhampton.

In June 2013, he signed a two-year contract with the Melbourne Storm.
Before signing with Melbourne, Central Queensland head coach and former Canterbury player Jason Hetherington had phoned the Canterbury-Bankstown recruitment team recommending that they sign Munster but he was told the club had no interest in signing the player.  Hetherington spoke to The Sydney Morning Herald saying "I made a few phone calls and just tried to find an opportunity for him. Obviously my alliance and heart lies with the Bulldogs and I went that direction first, I would have liked for them to have shown a bit more interest to be honest with you, but it's a competitive world out there".

On 21 September 2013, he won the Queensland Cup Rookie of the Year award.

Playing career

2014
Munster played for the Storm's NYC team in the earlier rounds of 2014, playing 9 games, scoring 7 tries and kicking 33 goals, before moving on to the Storm's Queensland Cup team, Eastern Suburbs Tigers. On 18 March, he extended his contract with the Storm until the end of 2017. On 3 May, he played for the Queensland Under-20s team against the New South Wales Under-20s team, playing off the interchange bench in the 30–8 loss at Penrith Stadium. In Round 12 of the 2014 NRL season, he made his NRL debut for the Storm against the North Queensland Cowboys.

2015
In round 6 against the Canberra Raiders, Munster returned for the Storm, filling in for the injured Billy Slater at fullback and also scoring his first NRL career try in the 14–10 win at Canberra Stadium. 

From Round 12 onwards after incumbent fullback Billy Slater was ruled out for the rest of the year due to a shoulder injury, Munster stepped up and filled in the vacant position at ease. In Round 22 against the Gold Coast Titans, he scored a hat trick in the Storm's 36–14 win at AAMI Park. Munster finished his promising 2015 NRL season with him playing in 19 matches and scoring 7 tries for the Storm.

2016
On 12 January, Munster was selected in the QAS Emerging Origin squad. On 31 January, while in the Emerging Maroons camp, he broke curfew and the QRL announced he would be excluded from its representative programs for the next 12 months. On 1 February, he was named in the Storm's 2016 Auckland Nines squad. Munster started the 2016 season playing at centre in round 1 against the St George Illawarra Dragons in the 18–16 win at AAMI Park.

Following Billy Slater's season-ending shoulder injury, Munster took over the fullback role for the rest of the season. On 11 May 2016, Munster extended his contract with the Melbourne Storm to the end of the 2019 season, earning around $2 million within those years.

On 2 October 2016, in the Storm's 2016 NRL Grand Final against the Cronulla-Sutherland Sharks, Munster played at fullback in the 14–12 defeat. Munster finished the 2016 NRL season with him playing in 24 matches and scoring 4 tries for the Storm.

2017
With Billy Slater set to return Fullback and to action from a shoulder injury which ended his 2016 season (after round 1), Munster was expected to spend time playing five-eighth following Blake Green's departure to Manly, in the 2017 season. However, with coach Craig Bellamy opted to rest Billy Slater for the opening 2 rounds of the season, Munster filled-in again at fullback with Ryley Jacks playing five-eighth. When fullback Billy Slater made his return from injury (coming off the bench in the 28th minute) in the Storm's Round 3 home game against the Brisbane Broncos, Munster then took over the five-eighth role. Following that Round 3 game, he was then ruled out of action with a fractured cheekbone until Round 7.

Munster was part of the Queensland Maroons Origin Squad for game 2 of the 2017 State of Origin Series as being 18th Man. Following a season-ending shoulder injury to Johnathan Thurston, Munster was selected to make his State of Origin debut, being selected at five-eighth with Michael Morgan shifting to the centres in the series deciding Game 3 match. On-debut, he produced an outstanding performance combining with his Storm team-mates in QLD's one-club spine combination of Cameron Smith at Hooker, Cooper Cronk at Halfback and Billy Slater at Fullback; to help QLD to a series win in the 22–6 victory over NSW at Suncorp Stadium.

On 1 October 2017, in the Storm's 2017 NRL Grand Final against the North Queensland Cowboys, Munster played at five-eighth in the 34–6 victory. Munster finished off a great 2017 NRL season with him playing in 21 matches, scoring 1 try and kicking 12 goals for the Storm.

On 3 October 2017, Munster was rewarded with selection in the 24-man Kangaroos squad for the 2017 Rugby League World Cup. On 3 November 2017, Munster made his test debut for Australia against France, where he started at halfback in place for James Maloney who pulled out of the match the night beforehand due to personal reasons and scored 2 tries in the 52–6 win at Canberra Stadium.

2018
Munster played in both the 2018 World Club Challenge and 2018 NRL Grand Final. He was sin-binned twice in one game during Melbourne's Grand Final loss to the Sydney Roosters.  Munster's second sin binning in the game came after he kicked Sydney Roosters player Joseph Manu in the back of the head.

In November 2018, Munster re-signed with Melbourne until the end of 2023.

2019
In the 2019 NRL season, Munster played 24 games as the club finished as runaway minor premiers.  Munster played in the club's preliminary final defeat against the Sydney Roosters at the Sydney Cricket Ground.

On 7 October 2019, Munster was named in the Australian side for the upcoming Oceania Cup fixtures.

2020
On 25 October 2020, Munster played for Melbourne in their 26–20 Grand Final win over Penrith.

On 4 November 2020, Munster scored his first State of Origin try in Queensland's 18–14 win in game 1 of the 2020 State of Origin series.

On 18 November 2020, Munster played in Queensland's 20–14 win clinching the 2020 State of Origin series where he was awarded the man of the match and the man of the series.

2021

Munster was selected by Queensland for game one of the 2021 State of Origin series after returning from injury.  During game one, Munster was placed on report after kicking New South Wales player Liam Martin as he attempted to play the ball.  Queensland would go on to lose game one 50-6.

The following week, Munster was placed on report for kicking another opponent, this time during Melbourne's victory over the New Zealand Warriors.

Munster played a total of 21 games for Melbourne in the 2021 NRL season as the club won 19 matches in a row and claimed the Minor Premiership.  Munster played in all three finals matches including the preliminary final where Melbourne suffered a shock 10-6 loss against eventual premiers Penrith.

2022
Munster received praise in 2022, with Rugby League Immortal Andrew Johns saying, "Munster is on his own, he's in another stratosphere. He's gone beyond superstar status." on his podcast Immortal Behaviour in the lead up to State of Origin.

Munster was again Man of the Match in Origin in the first game, which was a 16-10 QLD victory. Munster drew comparisons to Wally Lewis from retired Queensland captain Paul Vautin after the match. "He's getting closer to (Lewis) with the way he's playing," Vautin said. "He's an instinctive player, as Wally Lewis was. Wally wasn't structured by any imagination, but he was instinctive, and so is Cameron Munster."
Andrew Johns agreed, "He's just on another planet at the moment, no one is near him, you cannot coach against him because he is so unpredictable. He's on a stratosphere which is up there, we compared him in post game to Wally Lewis and that was Wally Lewis like. The bigger the occasion, the more pressure, the better he goes. You can't stop him, you can't coach against him and you can not stop him".

Munster scored his second Origin try in game 2 of the 2022 State of Origin series however QLD lost 44-12, sending it to a Suncorp decider.

On 8 July 2022, less than a week out of the Origin decider, breaking news began circulating that both Munster and QLD winger Murray Taulagi had returned positive Rapid Antigen Tests for COVID-19. It was confirmed the following morning that they had returned positive PCR swabs, ruling the pair out of the match.

In round 21 of the 2022 NRL season, Munster, starting a game at fullback for the first time since the 2019 State of Origin series decider scored the second hat-trick of his career in Melbourne's victory over the bottom placed Gold Coast Titans.

Following great speculation with the new 2023 Redcliffe Dolphins and uniting with Wayne Bennett, Munster pronounced his loyalty to Craig Bellamy and Melbourne Storm by inking a new long-term contract. With the goal to remain a one-club man, sighting his mum as a dominant influence in his decision.

In October he was named in the Australia squad for the 2021 Rugby League World Cup.

Controversy
In September 2021, a video was leaked to the media which showed Munster along with Melbourne players Brandon Smith and Chris Lewis partying with what appeared to be cocaine being used by Smith.

On 5 October 2021 following an investigation by the NRL's Integrity Unit, Munster was fined a total of $30,000 ($100,000 suspended) and he was also suspended from one match.  Munster was also stood down from Melbourne's leadership group.  Munster vowed to enter an alcohol rehabilitation centre for four weeks and said he would abstain from alcohol for a period of twelve months.

Honours
Individual
 RLPA Rookie of the Year: 2015
 Melbourne Storm Rookie of The Year: 2015
 Melbourne Storm Back of The Year: 2015
 Melbourne Storm Most Improved: 2016
 Melbourne Storm Members' Player of The Year: 2018, 2022
 Melbourne Storm Cameron Smith Player of The Year: 2018, 2022
 Dally M Five-Eighth of The Year: 2018, 2019, 2022
 RLPA Five-Eighth of The Year: 2018, 2019, 2022
 Wally Lewis Medal: 2020

Club
 2016 Minor Premiership Winners
 2016 NRL Grand Final Runner-up
 2017 Minor Premiership Winners
 2017 NRL Grand Final Winners
 2018 World Club Challenge Winners
 2018 NRL Grand Final Runner-up
 2019 Minor Premiership Winners
 2020 NRL Grand Final Winners
 2021 Minor Premiership Winners

Representative
 2017 State of Origin series Winners
 2020 State of Origin series Winners
 2022 State of Origin series Winners
 2021 Rugby League World Cup Winners

Statistics

NRL
 Statistics are correct as of end of the 2022 NRL season.

* = Unfinished season

State of Origin

Australia

References

External links

Melbourne Storm profile

1994 births
Living people
Australian rugby league players
Australia national rugby league team players
Queensland Rugby League State of Origin players
Melbourne Storm players
Junior Kangaroos players
Central Queensland Capras players
Eastern Suburbs Tigers players
Rugby league fullbacks
Rugby league five-eighths
Rugby league centres
Rugby league players from Rockhampton, Queensland